Cindy Morgan (born Cynthia Ann Cichorski) is an American actress known for her appearances as Lora/Yori in Tron and Lacey Underall in Caddyshack.

Life and career
Morgan was born in Chicago, Illinois, to Polish and German parents. Morgan attended 12 years of Catholic school, then studied communications at Northern Illinois University, where she was a DJ on the campus radio station. A commercial station in town invited her to report the news for them and she adopted the last name Morgan, from a story she had read about Morgan le Fay when she was 12 years old.

After graduation, Morgan worked at a television station in Rockford, Illinois, where she forecast the weather. She kept her hand in radio by working the graveyard shift at a local rock station. She returned to Chicago and deejayed on WSDM, until quitting on air during a labor dispute at the station, walking out with a record still spinning on the turntable.

Morgan then worked for Fiat Automobiles. She moved to Los Angeles in 1978, and became the Irish Spring girl in advertisements, while attending acting schools and workshops.

Morgan landed her first screen role in the 1980 comedy Caddyshack, playing the role of sexy bombshell Lacey Underall. In a 2012 interview, Morgan said of the role:

"Caddyshack was my first film and I'll say that the end product was so completely different, it was originally about the caddies. So at first, I had nothing to lose to audition. It was fun. All I did was focus on making the person sweat. Look 'em in the eye, do that thing many women know how to ..."

Morgan appeared in the 1982 hit Tron, the first computer-generated film. She played two characters: Lora, a computer programmer in the "real" world, and Yori, her alter-ego in the film's computer-generated flights of imagination.

Morgan has multiple television and film credits, including portraying two different roles on the primetime soap opera Falcon Crest, Lori Chapman in season one and Gabrielle Short in seasons six and seven. Morgan also played two different characters, in two different episodes,  on the television series Matlock. Her other credits include guest and minor appearances on The Larry Sanders Show, Amazing Stories, CHiPs, and a co-starring role on Bring 'Em Back Alive.

Morgan was an associate producer on five films produced by Larry Estes.

According to the documentary Caddyshack: The Inside Story,  Morgan was a resident of Florida and working on a book about her experiences during the making of Caddyshack.

Morgan did not participate in the making of Tron: Legacy, the 2010 sequel to the 1982 film, nor does she appear in any of the retrospective materials produced in conjunction with the sequel for use in a DVD/Blu-ray reissue of the film in 2011. She did reunite with her costar Bruce Boxleitner in character as Lora, in a mock news conference on April 2, 2010, promoting the release of Tron Legacy.

Charitable works 
Morgan, whose father fought in World War II, is passionate about supporting the United States military and helping to alleviate the financial hardship felt by those who have been called to serve in the wars in Afghanistan and Iraq. She was director of the Caddyshack Reunion Golf Tournament in 2006, which reunited some of the cast of Caddyshack (Morgan included), along with other celebrities. Subtitled "Playing for the Home Team" and hosted at Willow Crest Golf Club in Oak Brook, Illinois, the tournament raised funds (and awareness) to benefit the Illinois Military Family Relief Fund, an organization that helps the families of National Guard members and reservists on active duty.

Voice acting 
Morgan spent years in television and radio before becoming an actress. She presented the weather report at 6:00 p.m. and 10:00 p.m. in Rockford, Illinois, and weekends in Milwaukee. She was the morning drive DJ at the Chicago radio station WSDM, later "The Loop". She ran camera and was an FCC-licensed radio-station engineer. In 2006, Morgan provided the voice of Emily S. Preston in the Night Traveler multimedia adventure series produced by Lunar Moth Entertainment. She also voiced Ma3a in Buena Vista Interactive's PC game Tron 2.0 in 2003.

Filmography

Film

Television

References

External links

Moviefone Cindy Morgan Interview

Actresses from Chicago
American film actresses
American television actresses
American people of Polish descent
American voice actresses
Living people
Northern Illinois University alumni
Actresses from Illinois
20th-century American actresses
21st-century American women
Year of birth missing (living people)